JDG may be an abbreviation for:
 Jadgali language, an Indo-Aryan language spoken in Iran and Pakistan
 JD Gaming, a Chinese professional esports organization
 Jeongseok Airport, in South Korea
 Judge
 Book of Judges, a book of the Hebrew Bible
 Julian de Guzman, soccer player
 Journal of Differential Geometry, academic journal
 Jordan De Goey, Australian footballer